Fred Gavin Gordon (April 7, 1901 – April 6, 1983)  was an American film, television, and radio actor.

Life and career
Born Fred Gavin Gordon in Chicora, Wayne County, Mississippi, he worked as a railway clerk and attended acting school in his spare time.

He landed his first part on stage at the age of nineteen. After a film test, Gordon starred as Greta Garbo's leading man in Romance (1930). With his distinctive voice, Gordon acted in numerous radio dramas

He died in Canoga Park, California on the day before his 82nd birthday. He is interred in Magnolia Cemetery, Mobile, Alabama.

Partial filmography

 The Medicine Men (1929; short)
 Chasing Through Europe (1929) - Don Merrill
 His First Command (1929) - Lt. Freddie Allen
 Romance (1930) - Tom Armstrong
 The Silver Horde (1930) - Fred Marsh
 The Great Meadow (1931) - Evan Muir
 Shipmates (1931) - Mike
 Secret Service (1931) - Mr. Arlesford
 American Madness (1932) - Cyril Cluett
 Two Against the World (1932) - Victor H. 'Vic' Linley
 The Phantom of Crestwood (1932) - Will Jones
 The Bitter Tea of General Yen (1932) - Bob
Man Against Woman (1932) - George Perry
 Hard to Handle (1933) - John Hayden (uncredited)
 Mystery of the Wax Museum (1933) - George Winton
 Black Beauty (1933) - Capt. Jordan
 I Adore You (1933) - Alphonso Bouillaboise
 Female (1933) - Briggs
 Lone Cowboy (1933) - Jim Weston
 The Scarlet Empress (1934) - Capt. Gregori Orloff
 Wake Up and Dream (1934) - Seabrook
 Happiness Ahead (1934) - 'Jellie' Travis
 Bordertown (1935) - Brook Manville
 Grand Old Girl (1935) - The President
 The Good Fairy (1935) - Meredith, on-screen actor (uncredited)
 Women Must Dress (1935) - Philip Howard
 Red Hot Tires (1935) - Robert Griffin
 Bride of Frankenstein (1935) - Lord Byron
 Stranded (1935) - Jack
 Love Me Forever (1935) - Mitchell (uncredited)
 Page Miss Glory (1935) - Reporter Metz
 The Leavenworth Case (1936) - Henry Clavering
 Ticket to Paradise (1936) - Tony Bates
 High Hat (1937) - Gregory Dupont
 They Gave Him a Gun (1937) - Army Captain (uncredited)
 The Toast of New York (1937) - Southern Major (uncredited)
 Windjammer (1937) - J. Montague Forsythe
 I See Ice (1938) - Night Club Singer
 Paper Bullets (1941) - Kurt Parrish
 Murder by Invitation (1941) - Garson Denham
 Mr. Celebrity (1941) - Travers
 Suspicion (1941) - Dr. Bertram Sedbusk (uncredited)
 I Killed That Man (1941) - J. Reed
 The Lone Star Vigilantes (1942) - Major Halland Clark, aka Keller
 Centennial Summer (1946) - Trowbridge (uncredited)
 Notorious (1946) - Ernest Weylin (uncredited)
 Three on a Ticket (1947) - Pearson - aka Barton
 Philo Vance's Gamble (1947) - Oliver Tennant
 Knock on Wood (1954) - Car Salesman
 White Christmas (1954) - General Harold G. Carlton (uncredited)
 There's No Business Like Show Business (1954) - Geoffrey (uncredited)
 High Society (1955) - Frisbie the Butler
 A Life at Stake (1955) - Sam Pearson
 Pardners (1956) - Businessman (uncredited)
 The Vagabond King (1956) - Majordomo
 The Ten Commandments (1956) - Trojan Ambassador (uncredited)
 Johnny Tremain (1957) - Col. Smith
 Chicago Confidential (1957) - Alan Dixon
 King Creole (1958) - Mr. Primont - Druggist (uncredited)
 The Matchmaker (1958) - Rudolph
 The Bat (1959) - Lt. Andy Anderson
 All in a Night's Work (1961) - Mr. Carruthers (uncredited)
 Pocketful of Miracles (1961) - Mr. Cole
 Girls! Girls! Girls! (1962) - Mr. Peabody - Hat Shop Manager (uncredited)
 The Nutty Professor (1963) - Clothing Salesman (uncredited)
 The Patsy (1964) - Executive on Golf Course
 Sylvia (1965) - Butler (uncredited)

TV roles
Gordon also appeared in Alfred Hitchcock Presents, The Adventures of Ozzie and Harriet, M Squad, Perry Mason, Playhouse 90, The Real McCoys, The Red Skelton Show, Green Acres, The Beverly Hillbillies, Petticoat Junction, etc.

References

 Film Star Who's Who on the Screen, 1938

External links 

 

1901 births
1983 deaths
American male film actors
American male television actors
20th-century American male actors
American male radio actors
People from Wayne County, Mississippi